Glasgow Reform Synagogue is a synagogue in Newton Mearns, East Renfrewshire, Scotland. It is a member of the Movement for Reform Judaism and is the only Reform synagogue in Scotland. The synagogue was first known as Glasgow Progressive Synagogue, then Glasgow New Synagogue, before taking its current name.

The synagogue was founded in 1933 and moved to its present premises in 1968.

Nancy Morris, the first female rabbi in Scotland, was the synagogue's rabbi from 2003 to 2011, followed by Dr Kate Briggs (2014–2016).

Services 

Glasgow Reform Synagogue holds services every Shabbat (evening and morning) and for all the major festivals. Services are egalitarian and conducted in both Hebrew and English.

See also
 List of Jewish communities in the United Kingdom
 List of former synagogues in the United Kingdom
 Movement for Reform Judaism

References

External links 
 
 Glasgow Reform Synagogue Facebook page
 The Movement for Reform Judaism
 Glasgow New Synagogue on Jewish Communities and Records – UK (hosted by jewishgen.org).

1933 establishments in Scotland
Buildings and structures in East Renfrewshire
Reform synagogues in the United Kingdom
Newton Mearns
Religion in East Renfrewshire
Synagogues in Glasgow
Synagogues in Scotland